Chris Barton (born July 12, 1987) is a Canadian former professional ice hockey forward.

Playing career
Barton played two season with the Camrose Kodiaks in 2005–06 and 2006–07. He then played four years at Merrimack College. On March 30, 2011, Barton signed an amateur tryout contract with the American Hockey League's Bridgeport Sound Tigers.

During the 2011–12 season, he played with the ECHL's Wheeling Nailers and the American Hockey League's Wilkes-Barre/Scranton Penguins. For the month of November 2011, Barton was named ECHL Rookie of the month. Barton was also named to the 2011–12 ECHL All-Rookie Team. Barton re-signed with Wheeling on September 28, 2012. On March 17, 2013, Barton scored the 5,000th goal in Wheeling Nailers history.

Career statistics

Personal
When Barton attended Merrimack College, he majored in Management. Barton says he had a hockey stick in his hand when he was about 4 years old.

References

External links

1987 births
Living people
Bridgeport Sound Tigers players
Camrose Kodiaks players
Ice hockey people from Calgary
Merrimack Warriors men's ice hockey players
Wheeling Nailers players
Wilkes-Barre/Scranton Penguins players
Canadian ice hockey forwards